Presjeka may refer to the following places:

 Presjeka, Nevesinje
 Presjeka, Višegrad